The Diocese of Victoria in Texas is a Latin Church ecclesiastical territory, or diocese, of the Catholic Church in southern Texas in the United States.  The Cathedral of Our Lady of Victory serves as the cathedral church.  The diocese is a suffragan diocese in the ecclesiastical province of the metropolitan Archdiocese of Galveston-Houston.  The bishop as of 2023 is Brendan J. Cahill.

Territory 
The Diocese of Victoria in Texas covers the following counties:  Calhoun, Colorado, DeWitt, Fayette (but only that portion west of the Colorado River), Goliad, Jackson, Lavaca, Matagorda, Victoria, and Wharton.

History

1600 to 1982 
The first Catholic mission in Texas, then part of the Spanish Empire, was San Francisco de los Tejas. It was founded by Franciscan Father Damián Massanet in 1690 in the Weches area. The priests left the mission after three years, then established a second mission, Nuestro Padre San Francisco de los Tejas. near present day Alto in 1716.

In 1839, after the 1836 founding of the Texas Republic, Pope Gregory XVI erected the prefecture apostolic of Texas, covering its present day area. The prefecture was elevated to a vicariate apostolic in 184, the year that Texas became an American state. On May 4, 1847, Pope Pius IX erected the vicariate into the Diocese of Galveston. The Victoria area would remain part of several Texas dioceses for the next 135 years.

1982 to present 
Pope John Paul II established the Diocese of Victoria in Texas on April 13, 1982. Its territory was taken from the Archdiocese of San Antonio, the Diocese of Galveston-Houston and the Diocese of Corpus Christi.  The pope named Auxiliary Bishop Charles Grahmann of the Archdiocese of San Antonio as the first bishop of Victoria. As bishop, he created a consultation process that included clergy, members of religious orders, and lay people to assist in diocese planning.

In 1989, Pope John Paul II named Grahmann as coadjutor bishop of the Diocese of Dallas-Fort Worth.  Replacing Grahmann in Victoria in Texas was Reverend David Fellhauer from the same diocese, named by the pope in 1990. On December 29, 2004 the diocese was transferred from the province of San Antonio to the newly established Province of Galveston-Houston.After 25 years as bishop, Fellhauer retired in 2015.

The current bishop of the Diocese of Victoria in Texas is Brendan J. Cahill from the Archdiocese of Galveston-Houston. He was named bishop by Pope Francis in 2015.

Sex abuse 
On January 21, 2019, Bishop Cahill named three diocesan priests with credible accusations of sexual abuse of minors.  The investigation, run by an outside attorney, covered all allegations dating back to the founding of the diocese in 1982.  One priest, David L. Collela, was retired and a second priest, Guido Miguel Quiroz Reyes, was deceased.  The third priest, Alfred Prado, had been laicized and left the country.

Bishops
The list of bishops of the Diocese of Victoria in Texas and their terms of service:
 Charles Victor Grahmann (1982–1989), appointed Coadjutor Bishop of Dallas and later succeeded as bishop
 David Eugene Fellhauer (1990–2015)
 Brendan John Cahill (2015–present)

Education

High schools 
 Sacred Heart High School, Hallettsville
 St. Joseph High School, Victoria
 St. Paul High School, Shiner

See also

 Catholic Church by country
 Catholic Church in the United States
 Ecclesiastical Province of Galveston-Houston
 Global organisation of the Catholic Church
 List of Roman Catholic archdioceses (by country and continent)
 List of Roman Catholic dioceses (alphabetical) (including archdioceses)
 List of Roman Catholic dioceses (structured view) (including archdioceses)
 List of the Catholic dioceses of the United States

References

External links

 Roman Catholic Diocese of Victoria Official Site

Victoria
Christian organizations established in 1982
 
Victoria in Texas
Victoria in Texas
1982 establishments in Texas